The Bofors 75 mm Model 1934 was a mountain gun produced in Sweden by Bofors and sold abroad widely.  The Model 1934 was used by Germany, Belgium, the Netherlands and China in World War II.  Germany bought a small number of guns (12) for evaluation and training before the war and designated them as the 7.5 cm Gebirgshaubitze 34.  Belgian guns, known by them as the Canon de 75 mle 1934, captured by Germany were designated as 7.5 cm Gebirgskanone 228(b). The later model 1936 was purchased by Bulgaria.

Design
The Netherlands purchased a pack loadable version for their colonial-army in the Dutch East Indies, a region covered by thick forests and mountains.  The pack loadable version could be broken down into eight mule loads or towed by a four horse team, with a further six mules to carry ammunition and other supplies.  The Dutch guns were used briefly during the Dutch East Indies campaign in 1941–42.  Many of these went on to serve with the Imperial Japanese Army after the Dutch East Indies fell.  These were used by the IJA until ammunition stocks were depleted.  

The model purchase by Belgium was not a pack gun and was equipped for towing by motor transport.  The Belgian model had a one-piece box-trail that was hinged to fold upwards to reduce towing length and was equipped with steel disc wheels with rubber tires.

Users

References

Sources 
 Chamberlain, Peter & Gander, Terry. Infantry, Mountain and Airborne Guns. New York, Arco
 Gander, Terry and Chamberlain, Peter. Weapons of the Third Reich: An Encyclopedic Survey of All Small Arms, Artillery and Special Weapons of the German Land Forces 1939-1945. New York: Doubleday, 1979 
 Bishop, Chris, ed. Encyclopedia of Weapons of World War II. New York, Barnes and Noble, 1998 

Artillery of Sweden
Bofors
World War II mountain artillery
75 mm artillery
Military equipment introduced in the 1930s